Terrapins are one of several small species of turtle (order Testudines) living in fresh or brackish water. Terrapins do not form a taxonomic unit and may not be closely related. Many belong to the families Geoemydidae and Emydidae.

It appears that the term became part of common usage during the colonial era of North America and was carried back to Great Britain. Since then, it has been used in common names for testudines in the English language.

Species
Testudine species with "terrapin" in their common English-language names include:
 Bengal eyed terrapin, Burmese eyed turtle or Burmese peacock turtle, Morenia ocellata, a testudine in the family Geoemydidae found in Burma and possibly Yunnan, China.
 Diamondback terrapin or just "terrapin", Malaclemys terrapin, a testudine of the family Emydidae, native to North America and Bermuda.
 European pond terrapin or European pond turtle, Emys orbicularis, a testudine in the family Emydidae found in Central Europe, West Asia and parts of North Africa. 
 Indian pond terrapin, or Indian black turtle, Melanochelys trijuga, a testudine in the family Geoemydidae found in South Asia.
 Mexican spotted terrapin or Mexican spotted wood turtle, Rhinoclemmys rubida, a species of testudine in the family Geoemydidae, endemic to Mexico.
 Northern river terrapin, Batagur baska, a critically endangered testudine in the family Geoemydidae native to Cambodia.
 Painted terrapin, Batagur borneoensis, a testudine in the family Geoemydidae native to Brunei, Indonesia, Malaysia, and Thailand.
 Red-eared slider, or red-eared terrapin, Trachemys scripta elegans, a subspecies of pond slider in the family Emydidae native to southern North America. It is a popular pet and an invasive species in many places.
 Serrated hinged terrapin, Pelusios sinuatus, is a species of testudine in the family Pelomedusidae found in southern Africa.
 Seychelles black terrapin, Pelusios seychellensis, an extinct species of testudine in the family Pelomedusidae that was endemic to the Seychelles.
 Smiling terrapin or black marsh turtle, Siebenrockiella crassicollis, a testudine in the family Geoemydidae native to Southeast Asia.
 Southern river terrapin, Batagur affinis, a testudine in the family Geoemydidae native to Cambodia.
 Striped-neck terrapin or Caspian turtle, Mauremys caspica, a testudine in the family Geoemydidae (Bataguridae), native to the eastern Mediterranean region.
Yellow-bellied slider or Yellow-bellied terrapin, Trachemys scripta scripta, another subspecies of pond slider in the family Emydidae native to southern North America. Like the red-eared slider, it is a popular pet and an invasive species in many places.

References

Reptile common names
Batagur
Emys
Malaclemys
Mauremys
Melanochelys
Morenia
Pelusios
Rhinoclemmys
Siebenrockiella
Trachemys